Scottish housing may refer to:
Housing in Scotland 
Scottish Housing Regulator